Elvia Alvarado is a Honduran human rights activist who has been involved in several peasant organizations.
She became a social activist through the Catholic Church, and organized women in the city to become nurses to distribute food to malnourished children. Because of her work in land recovery Alvarado has been arrested and tortured a few times by  police and security forces. Currently she is the head of International Relations of the Union of Rural Workers.

Alvarado's story is told in the best selling book translated and edited by Medea Benjamin, Don't Be Afraid Gringo: A Honduran Woman Speaks from the Heart: The Story of Elvia Alvarado, as well as in the PBS documentary Elvia and the Fight for Land and Liberty.

References

"Peace Corps Online" last accessed January 10, 2007

Year of birth missing (living people)
Living people
Honduran Roman Catholics
Honduran human rights activists
Women human rights activists
Honduran women activists